Sahatwar is a big town with the official status of nagar panchayat in Ballia district in the Indian state of Uttar Pradesh.

Demographics 
Sahatwar nagar panchayat has population of 20,615 of which 10,731 are males while 9,884 are females as per 2011 census.

Population of Children in 0-6 age group is 3148 which is 15.27% of total population of Sahatwar (NP). Female Sex Ratio is of 921 against state average of 912. Moreover Child Sex Ratio in Sahatwar is around 970 compared to Uttar Pradesh state average of 902. Literacy rate of Sahatwar is 67.30% lower than state average of 67.68%. In Sahatwar, Male literacy is around 75.93% while female literacy rate is 57.85%.

Temples
The Mahatpaleswar Nath temple (Old Shiva temple) is in the heart of the city. This city is also surrounded by a number of other temples, including Palat Baba to the east, Thakur Ji (Baulli) to the west, Sri Chainram Baba to the north, and Shri Ishwari Bhram Baba temple to the south. Apart from these some other old temples are there in Sahatwar as old Shankar bhagwan temple, Old Ram Janki Temple, Shajha Nand Braham Baba.

Economy
Sahatwar is a trade center for around a hundred nearby small villages, including Dumariya, Khanpur, Haldi, Parsha, Harpur, Bani ke Bari (Purab Tola), Datuali, Baburani, Kopadhi and New Basti Chandpur (Singhi Mathiya), Bisauli and Husenabad (Husainabad). It is well linked to surrounding areas by both rail and roads.

References 

Cities and towns in Ballia district

There are two mosques in the Sahatwar (Badi Masjid Near Police Chauki and Chhoti Masjid Near Purani Bazaar), All muslims offer their Salat on time and Pray for the peace, Harmony and prosperity of our village